Cyrus Hamlin (April 26, 1839 – August 28, 1867) was an attorney,  politician, and a general from Bangor, Maine, who served in the Union Army during the American Civil War.

Early life

Hamlin was born in Hampden, Maine, a suburb of Bangor. He was the third son of Hannibal Hamlin, the Vice President of the United States, and his first wife, Sarah Emery. His brother, Charles Hamlin, was a Union Army major who was appointed a brevet brigadier general at the end of the war.

Hamlin was educated at Hampden Academy and studied at Waterville College (now Colby College) in Waterville, Maine.  He was admitted to the bar in 1860 and practiced law for a year in Kittery, Maine.

Civil War

Hamlin was commissioned as a captain in the Union Army in April 1862, serving as an aide-de-camp to Maj. Gen. John C. Frémont. 

Hamlin was among the first to advocate enlisting African-American troops in the Union Army. In February 1863, he was appointed the first colonel of the 80th United States Colored Troops and was assigned to field duty in Louisiana. There he eventually took charge of a brigade of black troops and participated in the Siege of Port Hudson. He was promoted to brigadier general in December 1864 and assigned command of the military district of Port Hudson, Louisiana, Department of the Gulf. Hamlin was mustered out of the United States Volunteers on January 15, 1866. 

On February 21, 1866, President Andrew Johnson nominated Hamlin for the award of the honorary grade of brevet major general, U.S. Volunteers, to rank from March 13, 1865, and the U.S. Senate confirmed the award on April 26, 1866.

Hamlin was a Companion of the Military Order of the Loyal Legion of the United States.

Postbellum life

Hamlin remained in Louisiana after the war during the early days of Reconstruction, but died of yellow fever in 1867. Although he was initially interred in the Girod Street Cemetery in New Orleans, Louisiana, he was reburied three months later in his family plot at Mount Hope Cemetery in Bangor, Maine.

See also

List of American Civil War generals (Union)

Notes

References
 Eicher, John H., and David J. Eicher. Civil War High Commands. Stanford, CA: Stanford University Press, 2001. .
 Hunt, Roger D., and Jack R. Brown. Brevet Brigadier Generals in Blue. Gaithersburg, MD: Olde Soldier Books, Inc., 1990. .

External links

University of Maine biography of Hamlin

Union Army generals
People of Maine in the American Civil War
People from Bangor, Maine
Louisiana politicians
American people of English descent
Children of vice presidents of the United States
1839 births
1867 deaths
Deaths from yellow fever
People from Hampden, Maine
Colby College alumni
Burials at Mount Hope Cemetery (Bangor, Maine)